The Amami woodcock (Scolopax mira) is a medium-sized wader. It is slightly larger and longer-legged than Eurasian woodcock, and may be conspecific.

This species is a restricted-range endemic found only in forests on two small islands of the Amami Islands chain in South Japan. Insofar as its habits are known, they are similar to Eurasian woodcock.

Taxonomy and systematics  
The Amami woodcock was originally described as a subspecies of the Eurasian woodcock, due to a juvenile that resembled the Eurasian woodcock in coloration. Later, some argued that the Amami woodcock was a distinct species—Kobayashi in 1979 and  Cramp & Simmons in 1983. Comparison between the two species revealed their distinct physical features, and led to the emergence of the Amami woodcock as a distinct species.

References

Further reading
Shorebirds by Hayman, Marchant and Prater,

External links

BirdLife Species Factsheet.

Scolopax
Endemic birds of Japan
Birds of the Ryukyu Islands
Wading birds
Birds described in 1916
Taxa named by Ernst Hartert